Argyle was an electoral district for the Legislative Assembly in the Australian State of New South Wales from 1856 to 1904, including Argyle County surrounding Goulburn.  The town of Goulburn was in Southern Boroughs from 1856 to 1859 and then Goulburn. The district had previously been represented by the district of County of Argyle in the partially elected Legislative Council.

It elected two members simultaneously between 1880 and 1894, with voters casting two votes and the first two candidates being elected.

Members for Argyle

Election results

References

Former electoral districts of New South Wales
1856 establishments in Australia
1904 disestablishments in Australia
Constituencies established in 1856
Constituencies disestablished in 1904